Arnfried Heyne (29 December 1905 – 12 January 1978) was a German film editor, who also worked as assistant director. He was one of several editors to work on Leni Riefenstahl's Olympia (1938).

Selected filmography
 How Shall I Tell My Husband? (1932)
 Donogoo Tonka (1936)
 The Broken Jug (1937)
 Bachelor's Paradise (1939)
 Destiny (1942)
 Vienna Blood (1942)
 Vienna 1910 (1943)
 The White Dream (1943)
 The Immortal Face (1947)
 The Singing House (1948)
 The Heavenly Waltz (1948)
 Gateway to Peace (1951)
 The Mine Foreman (1952)
 The Emperor Waltz (1953)
 Marriage Sanitarium (1955)
 Espionage (1955)
 The Congress Dances (1955)
 Emperor's Ball (1956)
 Love, Girls and Soldiers (1958)
 Arena of Fear (1959)
 As the Sea Rages (1959)
 Crime Tango (1960)
 The White Horse Inn (1960)
 Mariandl (1961)
 The Adventures of Count Bobby (1961)
 The Sweet Life of Count Bobby (1962)
 The Merry Widow (1962)
 Wedding Night in Paradise (1962)
 An Alibi for Death (1963)
 The Model Boy (1963)
 Our Crazy Nieces (1963)
 Help, My Bride Steals (1964)
 Schweik's Awkward Years (1964)
 In Bed by Eight (1965)
 Count Bobby, The Terror of The Wild West (1966)
 Help, I Love Twins (1969)
 My Father, the Ape and I (1971)

References

Bibliography 
 Rother, Rainer. Leni Riefenstahl: The Seduction of Genius. Bloomsbury Publishing, 2003.

External links 
 

1905 births
1978 deaths
German film editors
Film people from Dresden